This page records the details of the Japan national football team in 2003.

Results

Players statistics

External links
Japan Football Association

Japan national football team results
2003 in Japanese football
Japan